The Hawaii Hochi (Japanese: ハワイ報知) is a six-day-a-week Japanese-language newspaper published and sold in Hawaii. The newspaper was founded in 1912 to serve the Japanese immigrant community in Hawaii. Founder Frederick Kinzaburo Makino had recently been released from a ten-month prison sentence for his role in organizing a 1909 labor strike among sugarcane plantation workers. Disappointed by existing newspapers' coverage of continuing labor disputes, Makino established the Hochi to present a "non-party and independent" perspective on the issues then facing Japanese Americans in Hawaii. After some initial financial struggles, the Hochi became one of the primary sources for news related to political issues important to the island's Japanese community, publicly supporting legislation to extend Asian American citizenship rights and ease restrictions on Japanese language schools, as well as another strike in 1920. The paper was one of only a few to discuss racial inequality in the islands during the highly publicized Massie Trial of 1932.

An English section, called "the Bee" for its sting, was introduced in 1925 in order to appeal to Nisei who were not fluent in Japanese. During World War II, the paper was renamed the Hawaii Herald in response to anti-Japanese sentiment. Unlike other prominent Japanese-language newspaper editors, like the Nippu Jiji'''s Yasutaro Soga, Makino managed to avoid incarceration, and in 1952 the Hochi returned to its original title. Makino died in 1953, and in 1962 the paper was purchased by Japanese newspaperman Konosuke Oishi. In 1969, Oishi created an English-only sister paper under the name Hawaii Herald. The Herald was discontinued after four years, but was brought back in 1980 and continues to run alongside the Hochi today.

At its peak in the early 1990s, the Hawaii Hochi'' had a circulation of 9,000. The number has since dwindled to around 3,000, but the paper is still delivered by mail today, the only remaining Japanese-language semi-daily in the islands.  The newspaper's publishing company also operates a commercial printing business.

See also
 Japanese in Hawaii
 Nippu Jiji
 Oahu Sugar Strike of 1920
 Japanese language education in the United States

References

External links 
 The Hawaii Herald

Mass media in Honolulu
Newspapers published in Hawaii
Newspapers established in 1912
Japanese-American culture in Honolulu
Japanese-language newspapers published in the United States
1912 establishments in Hawaii